Rickey Lee Brady, Jr. (born November 19, 1970) is a former professional American football tight end who has been a member of the Los Angeles Rams, New Orleans Saints, Philadelphia Eagles, Dallas Cowboys, Miami Dolphins, Tennessee Titans, Tampa Bay Buccaneers, Scottish Claymores and the Las Vegas Outlaws of the XFL.

Early years
Brady attended Putnam City West High School located in Oklahoma City.

College career
Brady attended the University of Oklahoma, where he was a four-year letterman on the Sooners football team. During his senior season in 1993, Brady earned first-team All-Big Eight Conference honors. He was also a member of the Oklahoma Sooners Men's Basketball team during the 1990–1991 season.

Professional career

Los Angeles Rams
Brady was selected in the sixth round (167th overall) of the 1994 NFL Draft by the Los Angeles Rams. He was released by the Rams on August 27, 1995.

New Orleans Saints
After being released by the Rams, the Saints signed him to the practice squad.

Philadelphia Eagles
On December 13, 1995 the Eagles activated Brady to the 53 man roster.

Dallas Cowboys (1st stint)
In 1996, Brady was a member of the Cowboys training camp.

Scottish Claymores
In 1997, Brady was drafted in the sixth round of the 1997 World League Draft. He played in all 10 games and recorded 20 catches for 322 yards.

Tampa Bay Buccaneers
Was a member of the training camp and was waived on August 25.

Tennessee Titans
Spent the 1998 season on the Titans roster, was released in 1999.

Miami Dolphins
Was signed in 1999 but was released for the start of the season.

Dallas Cowboys (2nd stint)
In 2000, Brady was signed as a free agent by the Dallas Cowboys. He was re-signed in the 2001 preseason.

Las Vegas Outlaws
Rickey Brady was the 37th pick of the XFL Draft by the Las Vegas Outlaws.

References

External links
 Rickey Brady at NFL.com
 Rickey Brady at Pro-Football-Reference.com
 Rickey Brady at College Football Reference

1970 births
Living people
American football tight ends
Las Vegas Outlaws (XFL) players
Los Angeles Rams players
Oklahoma Sooners football players
Sportspeople from Oklahoma City
Players of American football from Oklahoma
Scottish Claymores players
Dallas Cowboys players
Miami Dolphins players
Tennessee Titans players
Tampa Bay Buccaneers players
Philadelphia Eagles players
New Orleans Saints players
Oklahoma Sooners men's basketball players
American men's basketball players